Fadrique de Guzmán (died 1492) was a Roman Catholic prelate who served as Bishop of Mondoñedo (1462–1492).

Biography
In 1462, Fadrique de Guzmán was appointed during the papacy of Pope Pius II as Bishop of Mondoñedo.
He served as Bishop of Mondoñedo until his death in 1492.

References 

15th-century Roman Catholic bishops in Castile
Bishops appointed by Pope Pius II
1492 deaths